Cethosia biblis, the red lacewing, is a species of heliconiine butterfly belonging to the family Nymphalidae.

Subspecies
 C. b. biblis - Assam, central India – south-western China
 C. b. insularis C. & R. Felder, 1861 - Philippines (Luzon, Polillo, ?Babuyanes)
 C. b. nicobarica Felder, 1862 - Nicobar? 
 C. b. picta C. & R. Felder, [1867] - Sulawesi
 C. b. javana C. & R. Felder, [1867] - Java 
 C. b. logani Distant, 1881 – eastern Sumatra
 C. b. tambora (Doherty, 1891) - Sumbawa
 C. b. narmada Fruhstorfer, 1896 - Lombok
 C. b. narmadoides de Nicéville, 1898 - Bali
 C. b. perakana Fruhstorfer, 1902 – southern Thailand, Peninsular Malaya, Pulau Tioman
 C. b. ceramensis Fruhstorfer, 1902 - Serang
 C. b. atia Fruhstorfer, 1905 - Kalao
 C. b. alceste Fruhstorfer, 1905 - Bawean
 C. b. hainana Fruhstorfer, 1908 - Hainan
 C. b. tisamena Fruhstorfer, 1912 - India
 C. b. phanaroia Fruhstorfer - Hong Kong
 C. b. adantonia Fruhstorfer – western Sumatra
 C. b. sumbana Pagenstecher - Sumba
 C. b. floresiana Fruhstorfer - Flores
 C. b. sandakana Fruhstorfer - Borneo, ?Palawan
 C. b. liacura Fruhstorfer - Philippines (Mindanao)
 C. b. tagalorum Fruhstorfer - Philippines (Mindoro)
 C. b. togiana Fruhstorfer - Togian Islands
 C. b. buruana Holland - Buru
 C. b. amboinensis C. & R. Felder, [1867] - Ambon
 C. b. andamanica Stichel - Andaman?
 C. b. pemanggilensis Eliot, 1978 – Pemanggil 

The subspecies of Cethosia-biblis found in India are-

 Cethosia biblis tisamena Fruhstorfer, 1912 – Himalayan Red Lacewing
 Cethosia biblis andamanica Stichel, 1902 – Andaman Red Lacewing
 Cethosia biblis nicobarica Felder, 1862 – Nicobar Red Lacewing

Distribution
This species can be found from the Indian subcontinent eastwards to South-East Asia and East Asia, the eastern limit being the Philippines, and the southern limit being Indonesia.

Description
In this species the sexes are dimorphic. In males the dorsal sides of the wings are bright orange red, framed by a black outline with white spots. The undersides range from bright red to pale brown, interlaced by black and white. This astonishing pattern helps to disguise the shape of the butterfly, while the intense colour of the dorsal sides of the wings is a warning to predators that the red lacewing has a bad taste, deriving from the poisonous host plants of the caterpillars. The dorsal sides of the wings of the females are greyish-brownish with black spots and white bands and spots on the black margins.

Caterpillars have several reddish, black and white stripes, a black head and long black spikes that contain poison. In fact they mainly feed on poisonous climbing plants, mainly Passiflora species (P. cochinchinensis, P. moluccana, etc.).

Куколка Cethosia biblis 
Куколка Cethosia biblis бежевого цвета, с маленькими блестками. Слегка шевелит брюшком, таким образом подает признаки жизни.

Куколок не требуется кормить. Перед появлением на свет бабочки — куколка темнеет.

Gallery

References

 , 2009: A study of the subspecies of Cethosia biblis (Drury, 1773) from the Philippines (Lepidoptera: Nymphalidae). Nachr. entomol. Ver. Apollo N.F. 29 (4): 193-198.

External links
 Fotop.net
 HKLS

Acraeini
Butterflies of Asia
Butterflies of Indochina
Butterflies of Borneo
Butterflies described in 1773
Taxa named by Dru Drury
Articles containing video clips